Academy Award Performance: And the Envelope, Please is Maureen McGovern's third studio album, released in 1975. It was her last album for 20th Century Records.

Background 
Primarily a cover album, this album is completely devoted to Oscar-winning movie themes from the 1930s to 1974; it capitalizes the fact that it took McGovern only one year to introduce a second Oscar-winning song. The fourth track is a medley of "When You Wish Upon a Star" (from the 1940 animated film Pinocchio) and "Over the Rainbow" (from The Wizard of Oz). The album begins with just 34 seconds of the song "Thanks for the Memory" then fades into the next song ("The Continental," the oldest movie theme on this album). "Thanks for the Memory" is also the last track on the album and continues where it left off but fades immediately after the next verse.

Release 
There were two singles to come from this album: "We May Never Love Like This Again" (from The Towering Inferno, which was a minor hit for McGovern one year before) and "The Continental" (from the 1934 film The Gay Divorcee, which was the very first song to ever win an Oscar). Also during this year (and into 1976), McGovern recorded an entire album's worth of material for what would have been her fourth album on 20th Century Records. Only two singles from the project were released - "Even Better Than I Know Myself" and "Love Songs Are Getting Harder To Sing" (with the B-side "Stop Me If You've Heard This Song Before") - but due to poor reception of these singles on the pop chart, a full album was never released and remains in the vaults at Universal (parent company to 20th Century.)

Track listing

Personnel
Perry Botkin, Jr. - special effects
Tom Hensley, Mike Lang, Pete Jolly - piano
Lee Ritenour, David Cohen, Neil Levang - guitar
Max Bennett, Reinie Press, Steve LaFever - bass
Joe Correro, Sol Gubin - drums
Gene Estes - percussion
Iz Baker, Paul Shure, Jerry Vinci, Sid Sharp, Tibor Zelig, Henry Ferber, Assa Drori, Jimmie Getzoff, Harry Bluestone, Erno Neufeld, Nate Ross - violin
Dave Schwartz, Allan Harshman, Gerry Nuttycombe, Sven Reher - viola
Ray Kramer, Fred Seykora, Armand Kaproff - cello
Johnny Rotella, Gene Cipriano, Ronnie Lang, Bud Shank, Bill Green - woodwind
Gayle Levant - harp
Bill Peterson, Bud Brisbois, Tony Terran, Cappy Lewis, Buddy Childers - trumpet
Charles Loper, Dick Nash - trombone
Technical
Musical contractor: Charles H. Stern
Engineers: Stan Ross, Joe B. Mauldin
Design: Queens Graphics
Photography: Sunny K. Kohn

Charts

References

 Fred Bronson, The Billboard Book of Number 1 Hits (2003), p. 339.
 Godspeed Opera House Foundation, Show Music (Volume 6, Issues 1–2, 1988), p. 55.
 Film Score Monthly (Volume 6, 2001) p. 36.
 Maureen McGovern - Academy Award Performance

1975 albums
Maureen McGovern albums
Covers albums
20th Century Fox Records albums
Albums recorded at Gold Star Studios